The A Championship, also known as the Newstalk A Championship, was an association football league featuring League of Ireland reserve teams and emerging senior teams. It was a third level league in the Republic of Ireland football league system. It was formed in 2008 and disbanded following the 2011 season. Between 2009 and 2011 the league was sponsored by Newstalk. It was effectively absorbed into the League of Ireland U19 Division.

History
The idea of forming a regionalised A Championship was first proposed in 2006 as part of plan to reorganise the League of Ireland as a four tier structure. The A Championship eventually kicked off in 2008 and UCD A became the inaugural champions. Despite not defending their title in 2009, UCD subsequently went on to become the A Championship's most successful team. They were champions again in 2010  and then runners-up in 2011. Two other reserve teams, Shamrock Rovers A and Derry City A finished as champions in 2009 and 2011 respectively.

When the A Championship was founded in 2008, thirteen of the sixteen inaugural members were the reserve teams of League of Ireland clubs. The other three teams were Mervue United, Salthill Devon and Tullamore Town. Sporting Fingal were also expected to join the A Championship for the 2008 season. However when Kilkenny City withdrew from the First Division shortly before the season was due to start, Sporting Fingal were drafted in to replace them. The 2009 season featured six non-reserve teams. After  Mervue United gained promotion to the First Division, Salthill Devon and Tullamore Town were joined by Cobh Ramblers, Castlebar Celtic, F.C. Carlow and Tralee Dynamos.  The latter three were all making their debut at senior national level. They were also the first clubs from their respective counties of Mayo, Carlow and Kerry to play at this level. Castlebar Celtic and Tullamore Town both withdraw following the conclusion of the 2010 season but among their replacements were Fanad United. The non-reserve teams also represented the A Championship in the League of Ireland Cup and the FAI Cup.

In 2009 at the League of Ireland clubs' annual convention, Dundalk called for the A Championship to be scrapped, arguing that it was putting an unwelcome financial burden on participating clubs. At the same convention Waterford United proposed that it should be optional rather than compulsory for senior sides to field a reserve team in the league. Drogheda United raised concerns about the "unacceptable level" of refereeing. According to a report in the Irish Independent one club, short of two players for an away match, paid two locals to make up their team while a number of fixtures were postponed because clubs di not have enough players.

Following the conclusion of the 2011 season, the A Championship was absorbed into the League of Ireland U19 Division. Cobh Ramblers and Tralee Dynamos both unsuccessfully applied to join the 2012 League of Ireland First Division. Ramblers did however join the First Division in 2013 and Dynamos,  together with Fanad United, joined the U19 Division. In 2013 Shamrock Rovers entered their reserve team in the First Division.

Format
The A Championship format saw the members of the league split into two groups, divided roughly into southern and northern  groups. The two groups used a traditional round-robin format. In 2008, 2009 and 2010, the two group winners played off in a final. In 2011 the two group runners-up also qualified for the title play-off. A promotion and relegation system operated between the League of Ireland Premier Division, the League of Ireland First Division and the A Championship. Reserve teams were ineligible for promotion but the highest placed non-reserve teams qualified for a promotion/relegation play-off against a First Division team providing they finished in the top three of their group. Mervue United in 2008 and Salthill Devon in 2009 were both promoted to the First Division. In contrast Cobh Ramblers were relegated directly from the 2008 Premier Division to the 2009 A Championship after they failed to obtain a First Division license.

List of finals

Related competitions

A Championship Shield

A Championship Cup

Teams

Notes

See also
 2010 A Championship Cup

References

 
2008 establishments in Ireland
3
Ire
Sports leagues established in 2008
Ire
Summer association football leagues